Air Vice Marshal James Laurence Fuller Fuller-Good,  (20 September 1903 – 11 May 1983) was a Royal Air Force pilot in the 1920s, a senior officer during the Second World War and a senior RAF commander in the 1950s.

References
Air of Authority – A History of RAF Organisation – Air Vice-Marshal J L F Fuller-Good

|-

1903 births
1983 deaths
Commanders of the Order of the British Empire
Commanders of the Royal Victorian Order
Companions of the Order of the Bath
Graduates of the Royal Air Force College Cranwell
Royal Air Force air marshals
Royal Air Force personnel of the Malayan Emergency
Royal Air Force personnel of World War II